Greg Kelley is the name of:

 Greg Kelley, an American football star wrongly convicted of child sexual abuse covered in Outcry (miniseries)
 Greg Kelley (politician), a Canadian politician in the Quebec Liberal Party representing the district of Jacques-Cartier
 Gregory Kelley, American figure skater

See also

 Greg Kelly (disambiguation)
 Greg Kelly (born 1968), American television journalist
 Greg Kelly (Coronation Street), fictional character from the British soap opera Coronation Street